Colonial Place is a residential neighborhood in Norfolk, Virginia. It is a peninsula bordered by 38th Street on the south, and surrounded on three sides by the Lafayette River. It is a relatively racially mixed area that includes mostly single family homes and a few apartment buildings. Many large homes front the water and Mayflower Road arches around the shore of the river.

The Colonial Place Historic District is a national historic district listed on the National Register of Historic Places in 2002. It encompasses 1,090 contributing buildings and 4 contributing sites in a primarily residential section of Norfolk.  It is a middle-class and upper middle-class residential neighborhood that largely developed during the period 1903–1941. The neighborhood includes notable examples of the Queen Anne and Colonial Revival styles. Notable buildings include the Richard W. Peatross House (1908), Taylor House (1908) and Stuart Elementary School.

References

Historic districts on the National Register of Historic Places in Virginia
National Register of Historic Places in Norfolk, Virginia
Queen Anne architecture in Virginia
Colonial Revival architecture in Virginia
Buildings and structures completed in 1903
Neighborhoods in Norfolk, Virginia